The 2015 Baku Cup was a professional tennis tournament played on hard courts. This was the fifth edition of the tournament, and part of the 2015 WTA Tour. It took place in Baku, Azerbaijan between 27 July and 2 August 2015.

Points and prize money

Point distribution

Prize money

Singles main-draw entrants

Seeds

 1 Rankings are as of July 20, 2015

Other entrants
The following players received wildcards into the singles main draw:
  Oleksandra Korashvili
  Magda Linette 
  Zuleykha Šafářová

The following players received entry from the qualifying draw:
  Nigina Abduraimova
  Olga Ianchuk 
  Valentyna Ivakhnenko 
  Olga Savchuk 
  Patricia Maria Țig 
  Yang Zhaoxuan

The following player received entry as a lucky loser:
  Yuliya Beygelzimer

Withdrawals
Before the tournament
  Denisa Allertová → replaced by  Kateryna Bondarenko
  Klára Koukalová → replaced by  Donna Vekić
  Andreea Mitu → replaced by  Alexandra Panova
  Monica Niculescu → replaced by  Barbora Krejčíková
  Yaroslava Shvedova → replaced by  Margarita Gasparyan
  Kateřina Siniaková → replaced by  Elizaveta Kulichkova
  Tereza Smitková → replaced by  Çağla Büyükakçay
  Lesia Tsurenko (right wrist injury) → replaced by  Yuliya Beygelzimer
  Roberta Vinci → replaced by  Misa Eguchi
  Yanina Wickmayer → replaced by  Zhu Lin

Retirements
  Yuliya Beygelzimer (neck injury)
  Kateryna Bondarenko (right lower leg injury)
  Danka Kovinić (gastrointestinal illness)

Doubles main-draw entrants

Seeds

 1 Rankings are as of July 20, 2015

Other entrants 
The following pair received a wildcard into the doubles main draw:
  Amina Dik /  Zuleykha Šafářová

Champions

Singles

  Margarita Gasparyan def.  Patricia Maria Țig, 6–3, 5–7, 6–0

Doubles

  Margarita Gasparyan /  Alexandra Panova def.  Vitalia Diatchenko  /  Olga Savchuk, 6–3, 7–5

External links
 Official website

Baku Cup
Baku Cup
2015 in Azerbaijani sport